The Dodge M4S is an American high performance prototype sports coupe originally engineered, designed, and built by Dodge in 1981 as a technology demonstrator vehicle. It was designed by then chief designer of Dodge, Bob Ackerman. The designation M4S denotes "Midengine, 4 cylinder, Sport“. From its conception, the car was intended to be built as a fully engineered running prototype rather than as a display piece.

Chrysler designed the body and conducted extensive wind tunnel testing to achieve a drag coefficient of .236.  Although the car was designed by Chrysler, actual construction of the vehicle was handled by subcontractors.  The semi monocoque race car chassis was ordered from Huffaker of California. 3-D Industries of Madison Heights, Michigan modeled the body and created molds. Special Projects, Inc. of Plymouth, Michigan cast the body panels, assembled the body and interior, and gave the car its signature “root beer brown” paint color by painting layers of pearl over a black base coat.  Specialized Vehicles, Inc., of Troy, Michigan handled fabrication, final assembly, and maintenance of the completed car.

The car was made famous by its appearance in The Wraith, a 1986 supernatural film.

The car has since gained an enthusiast cult following, prompted by the fame it gained from appearing in The Wraith.

References

1980s cars
M4S
Collection of Walter P. Chrysler Museum